Siegfried Schürenberg (12 January 1900 – 31 August 1993) was a German film actor. He appeared in more than 80 films between 1933 and 1974. He was born in Detmold, Germany and died in Berlin, Germany in 1993, at age 93. Although he never played leading roles, he was a well-known supporting actor who played the role of Sir John in numerous Edgar Wallace films during the 1960s. He was also a busy dubbing actor, for example as the German voice for Clark Gable in most of his films, including Rhett Butler in Gone with the Wind.

Selected filmography

 The Marathon Runner (1933)
 A Man Wants to Get to Germany (1934) - Conner, British friend
 Master of the World (1934) - Werner Baumann
 Asew (1935) - Sawinkoff
 The Cossack and the Nightingale (1935) - Herr von Tremoliere
 Forget Me Not (1935) - Hellmut von Ahrens - Erster Offizier
 The Higher Command (1935) - Lord Beckhurst
 The Traitor (1936) - Neumann
 Men Without a Fatherland (1937) - Hauptmann Angermann
 To New Shores (1937) - Kapitän Gilbert
 The Man Who Was Sherlock Holmes (1937)
 Nights in Andalusia (1938) - Rittmeister Moraleda
 Kautschuk (1938) - Ein Mitglied der Konferenz (uncredited)
 The Green Emperor (1939) - Verteidiger
 Escape in the Dark (1939) - Werkslaborant Dr. Marlow
 Madame Butterfly (1939) - Paul Fieri
 Sensationsprozess Casilla (1939) - James, ihr Dienter
 Fahrt ins Leben (1940) - 1. Offizier
 Am Abend auf der Heide (1941) - Jensen
 Conchita and the Engineer (1954)
 The Plot to Assassinate Hitler (1955) - Generaloberst Friedrich Fromm
 Du mein stilles Tal (1955) - Herr Widmeier
 Alibi (1955) - Vorsitzender des Gerichts
 Pulverschnee nach Übersee (1956) - Mister Frank Jones (narrator, uncredited)
 My Father, the Actor (1956) - Gustav, Intendant
 The Story of Anastasia (1956) - Amerikanischer Anwalt
 A Heart Returns Home (1956) - Dr. Weißbach
 Stresemann (1957) - Lord d'Abernon
 Made in Germany (1957) - Cullampton Bubble
 Glücksritter (1957) - Brack
 The Night of the Storm (1957) - Herr Herterich
 Der Stern von Afrika (1957) - Rektor
 Different from You and Me (1957) - Staatsanwalt
 Goodbye, Franziska (1957) - Harris
 Gejagt bis zum Morgen (1957) - Polizeiinspektor
 Die Schönste (1957) - Wiedemann
 Lilli - ein Mädchen aus der Großstadt (1958) - Holland
 Das verbotene Paradies (1958) - Direktor Krailing
 Solange das Herz schlägt (1958) - Dr. Wieler
 The Journey (1959) - Von Rachlitz
 And That on Monday Morning (1959) - Herr von Schmitz
 The Rest Is Silence (1959) - Johannes Claudius
 Menschen im Hotel (1959) - Dr. Behrend
 Die Brücke (1959) - Lt. Colonel
 Old Heidelberg (1959) - Staatsminister Haugk
 Ich schwöre und gelobe (1960) - Krankenhausdirektor (uncredited)
 The Avenger (1960) - Maj. Staines
 Frau Irene Besser (1961)
 Das letzte Kapitel (1961) - Konsul Ruben
 The Door with Seven Locks (1962) - Sir John
 The Inn on the River (1962) - Sir John
 The Squeaker (1963) - Sir Geoffrey Fielding
 The Indian Scarf (1963) - Sir Henry Hockbridge
 Room 13 (1964) - Sir John
 The Curse of the Hidden Vault (1964) - Sir John
 Der Hexer (1964) - Sir John
 Neues vom Hexer (1965) - Sir John
 Der unheimliche Mönch (1965) - Sir John
 The Hunchback of Soho (1966) - Sir John
 The Trygon Factor (1966) - Sir John - German Version (uncredited)
 The Oldest Profession (1967) - (segment "Belle époque, La")
 Creature with the Blue Hand (1967) - Sir John
 The Jungle Book (1967) - Shere Khan (voice, German Version)
 The Monk with the Whip (1967) - Sir John
 The Hound of Blackwood Castle (1968) - Sir John
 Asterix and Cleopatra (1968) - Julius Caesar (German version, narrator)
 Klassenkeile (1969) - Chefredakteur Berg
 Herzblatt oder Wie sag' ich's meiner Tochter? (1969) - Rektor
 The Sex Nest(1970) - Werner Zibell alias Der General
 Gentlemen in White Vests (1970) - Kommissar Berg
 Musik, Musik - da wackelt die Penne (1970) - Minister
 Who Laughs Last, Laughs Best (1971) - General Pusch
 The Devil Came from Akasava (1971) - Sir Philip
 The Body in the Thames (1971) - Sir John
 Bleib sauber, Liebling (1971) - Gottwald Baumgartner
 X312 - Flug zur Hölle (1971) - Bankpräsident Alberto Rupprecht
 Der Todesrächer von Soho (1972) - Dr. Bladmore
 When Mother Went on Strike (1974) - Onkel Walter Habinger
 The Immortal Bachelor (1975) - Man at sewer (uncredited) (final film role)

References

External links

1900 births
1993 deaths
German male film actors
People from Detmold
20th-century German male actors